Catharine Elizabeth Bean Cox (1865–1964) was born in Iowa into a Quaker family on August 11, 1865.  She received a BA from Bryn Mawr College  in 1889.  In 1891, she married Isaac Milton Cox.  In 1898, she and her family moved to Hawaii, spurred by Isaac's poor health.  She taught at Punahou School and helped Anna Rice Cooke research and catalog her art collection, which became the Honolulu Museum of Art.   Catharine Cox also served as director of the Honolulu Museum of Art from 1927 to 1928.  She died December 7, 1964.

The Catharine E. B. Cox Award for Excellence in the Visual Arts was established in her honor in 1985 by her grandchildren Charles Shipley Cox of La Jolla, California, Doak C. Cox of Honolulu and Richard H. Cox of Honolulu.

Notes

References
 Bean, Bernie, The Life and Family of John Bean of Exeter and his Cousins, Seattle, John Bean of Exeter Family Association, 1970.

American art historians
Directors of museums in the United States
Women museum directors
People from Honolulu
Hawaii art
1865 births
1964 deaths
Bryn Mawr College alumni
American women historians
Women art historians